Sincerely Louis C.K. is a stand-up comedy film by American comedian Louis C.K. released on 4 April 2020. Filmed in 2020 in Washington, D.C., it is C.K.'s first stand-up performance to be released following his admission to several acts of sexual misconduct in 2017. It was published through his website for download and streaming for $7.99 with no advance notice. It received the Grammy Award for Best Comedy Album at the 64th Annual Grammy Awards.

Production 
In the credits, C.K. thanked various people, including comedians Dave Chappelle, Chris Rock, Bill Burr, Jimmy Carr, Norm Macdonald, Joe Rogan, and Kevin Brennan (who opened for C.K. during the taping of the special), as well as Bob Dylan, and his girlfriend Blanche Gardin. He dedicated the special to his mother who had died in 2019.

Reception 
Rotten Tomatoes gives the show  rating based on  reviews.

In his three-star review, Brian Logan of The Guardian argued that some of the material was "wickedly good", but also critiqued C.K. for the "self-pity" he displayed in his set. 

Kyle Smith of National Review argued that "Louis C.K. Remains Brilliant", and also critiqued the headlines of entertainment outlets such as Variety stating, "Critics seem to be trying to shame C.K.’s viewers away from his act by warning them it contains inappropriate ideas... it's been more than half a century since Lenny Bruce, but suddenly making jokes about 'touchy subjects' is beyond the pale?"

Some critics criticized C.K., and argued that the public deserved an honest and frank discussion about the instances of sexual misconduct, and that said discussion must be a part of this special. Other reviewers commended him for how he addressed his misconduct, with Hollywood in Toto declaring "The special grows stronger toward the end, and his final reflections on 'you know what' prove illuminating and funny."

References

External links
 

2020 films
2020 comedy films
Films directed by Louis C.K.
Stand-up comedy concert films
Louis C.K. albums
American comedy films
2020s English-language films
2020s American films